Parliamentary elections were held in Sri Lanka on 2 April 2004. The ruling United National Party of Prime Minister Ranil Wickremesinghe was defeated, winning only eighty two seats in the 225-member Sri Lankan parliament. The opposition United People's Freedom Alliance won 105 seats. While this was eight seats short of an absolute majority, the Alliance was able to form a government.

On 6 April President Chandrika Kumaratunga commissioned Mahinda Rajapaksa, a former Labour Minister, as Prime Minister.

Parties

The United People's Freedom Alliance was formed as an alliance between President Kumaratunga's party, the Sri Lanka Freedom Party (SLFP), and the leftist Janatha Vimukthi Peramuna. Other parties that belong to the People's Alliance, such as the Communist Party of Sri Lanka, the Democratic United National Front, the Lanka Sama Samaja Party, Mahajana Eksath Peramuna and the Sri Lanka Mahajana Pakshaya, later joined UPFA.

In the 2001 elections, the People's Alliance and Janatha Vimukthi Peramuna had fought separately. Then the JVP won 9.1% of the vote and sixteen seats. At this election it is reported than as many as thirty nine JVP members won seats as UPFA candidates.

The runner-up in the election was the United National Front (UNF), the front led by the United National Party. In addition to the UNP, the UNF also had candidates from minor parties such as Ceylon Workers Congress.

Other parties winning seats were the Buddhist, Sinhala nationalist outfit Jathika Hela Urumaya (JHU), the pro-LTTE alliance Tamil National Alliance (TNA), the Sri Lanka Muslim Congress (SLMC) and the Eelam People's Democratic Party (EPDP). The Democratic Peoples Liberation Front (the political wing of PLOTE) lost their parliamentary representation.

Campaign

Prime Minister Ranil Wickremasinghe's UNF government had been in limbo since October 2003, when President Kumaratunga declared a state of emergency and took three key cabinet portfolios for her party.  During the campaign, she argued that Wickremasinghe had been too soft on the Liberation Tigers of Tamil Eelam and promised to take a harder line.  The UNF, for its part, stressed the economic gains that had been made with the ceasefire and the need to find a negotiated solution to the civil war.

Voting

Polling booths opened at 07:00 local time and remained open until 16:00  (01:00 to 10:00 UTC). A total of 10,670 polling stations were installed to receive votes from 12.9 million eligible voters. Voter turnout was high, at around 75%.

The backdrop to polling day was tense, with continued guerrilla activity by Tamil Tiger separatists and five politically motivated murders in the run-up to the election. However, except for a slightly lower turnout in the Eastern Province, Sri Lanka and allegations of fraud in the North, the election was calm and orderly.

Sri Lanka's Elections Commissioner Dayananda Dissanayake said that despite reported cases of electoral malpractice in certain polling stations in six electoral districts, there would be no fresh elections in these areas and the results issued by the Commission were final.

Results
The United People's Freedom Alliance vote and seat totals are compared with the combined People's Alliance and JVP vote and seat counts at the 2001 election.

By province

By electoral district

Elected members

Notes

References

 
 
 
 
 
 
 
 
 
 

 
Parliamentary elections in Sri Lanka
Sri Lanka
April 2004 events in Asia